Karl Heinrich Hoff (8 September 1838, Mannheim – 13 May 1890, Karlsruhe) was a German genre painter, best known for his 18th century period scenes. He is generally referred to as The Elder, to distinguish him from his son, who was also a painter.

Biography 
His father, Carl (1804–1891), was a confectioner. From 1855 to 1858, he studied at the Academy of Fine Arts, Karlsruhe, with Johann Wilhelm Schirmer and Ludwig des Coudres. In 1858, developed an interest in the Düsseldorf school of painting and went there to continue his studies with Benjamin Vautier. After an extended series of study trips through France, Italy, Greece and Eastern Europe, he set up his own business in Düsseldorf, where he produced his first series of genre paintings. During this time, he married Marie Sohn (1841–1893), daughter of the painter Karl Ferdinand Sohn. They had two sons.

In 1874, he became involved with a private group planning the proposed  , which opened in 1876, and the animal welfare society "Fauna", which was seeking to ensure that the park was properly cared for.

He was also a poet. In 1877, he composed tableaux vivants for the "Kaiserfest", honoring Kaiser Wilhelm I on the occasion of his visit there. The following year, he wrote a comic epic called Schein (appearance), billed as a "sketchbook in verse".In 1878, he was appointed a Professor at the Karlsruhe Academy, succeeding , who had moved to Munich. In 1882, he issued Artists and Art Writers, a controversial brochure containing violent attacks against art critics and criticism in general. In 1886, he made use of his experience with the carnival in Düsseldorf to help  organize a large historical pageant, celebrating the 500th anniversary of the University of Heidelberg.

He suffered from tuberculosis and died in 1890, aged only fifty-one, following a brief illness.

References

Further reading 
 Wolfgang Müller von Königswinter: "Ein Rococomaler der Gegenwart". In: Die Gartenlaube. Vol. 21, 1872, pp. 336–338 (Online)
 Friedrich von Boetticher: Malerwerke des neunzehnten Jahrhunderts. Vol.1, 2, Dresden 1891, pp. 550–552 (Online) @ Internet Archive
 Leo Mülfarth: Kleines Lexikon Karlsruher Maler, Badenia-Verlag, Karlsruhe, 1987

External links 

More works by Hoff @ ArtNet

1838 births
1890 deaths
19th-century German painters
19th-century German male artists
German genre painters
German poets
Academic staff of the Academy of Fine Arts, Karlsruhe
19th-century deaths from tuberculosis
Tuberculosis deaths in Germany
Artists from Mannheim